The piezoelectric coefficient or piezoelectric modulus, usually written d33, quantifies the volume change when a piezoelectric material is subject to an electric field, or the polarization on application of a stress. In general, piezoelectricity is described by a tensor of coefficients ; see  for further details.

External links
List of piezoelectric materials
Table of properties for lead zirconate titanate
Piezoelectric terminology

Electrical phenomena